Gabriel Argolo Morbeck (born 20 August 1997) is a Brazilian footballer who currently plays as a forward.

Club career
Gabriel Morbeck joined Roasso Kumamoto in early 2017, having spent his whole career prior with Vitória in Brazil.

Career statistics

Club

Notes

References

External links

 Profile at Roasso Kumamoto

1997 births
Living people
Brazilian footballers
Brazilian expatriate footballers
Association football forwards
Esporte Clube Vitória players
Roasso Kumamoto players
Júbilo Iwata players
SC Sagamihara players
J2 League players
J1 League players
Brazilian expatriate sportspeople in Japan
Expatriate footballers in Japan